The Prisoner is an allegorical British science fiction television series starring Patrick McGoohan. A single season of 17 episodes was filmed between September 1966 and January 1968. The first episode in the UK aired in September 1967, although the global premiere was in Canada several weeks earlier. The series was released in the US in June 1968.

With the production order being different from the original broadcast order, extensive debate has taken place among dedicated fans regarding the "correct" order to view these episodes. Several different orders are listed below.

Episode list  

Episode sequences
 Prod: The studio production order. This is not an intended viewing order.
 ITC: "Official" ITC sequence. This is the sequence in which the episodes were originally broadcast in the UK. This is the order used in all UK DVD and BluRay releases including the 2007 official 40th anniversary and 2017 official 50th anniversary Network DVD and Blu-ray releases.
 US Order: Used for the US airings, since the first showing on CBS in 1968. The original broadcast skipped "Living in Harmony", but the episode was reinstated in following re-airings.
 KTEH: Arranged by Scott Apel for KTEH channel 54, a PBS member station in San Jose, California
 6 of 1: Endorsed by Six of One, The Prisoner Appreciation Society, and used in the A&E DVDs. The UK Sci Fi Channel marathon used a similar order, but with "Dance of the Dead" preceding "Free for All", and "The General" preceding "A. B. and C.".
 TUW: The recommended order from the world's largest Prisoner website, edited by author of 'The Prisoner The Essential Guide' Rick Davy, The Unmutual Website.
 Gigacorp: The recommended viewing order from the fansite The Prisoner U.S. Home Page.
 ITC Inf: The episodes as listed with synopses in a period ITC booklet titled Story Information, archived as storyinf.pdf on disc 5 of the 2009 Blu-ray set. This also gives the first episode title as "The Arrival". Known as 'The Warehouse Order', this order was largely used by Channel 4's transmission of the series in 1983-84
 2.0: A viewing order recommended by fan-editor SirQuacky. Four sets of thematically linked trilogies, bookended with the premiere and finale. Skips "Do Not Foresake Me Oh My Darling", "Living in Harmony", and "The Girl Who Was Death".

Alternative versions
Alternative versions of two episodes exist and have been commercially released. An early edit of "Arrival", with a different music score and additional dialogue and scenes not in the broadcast version, was located in the 2000s and released to DVD in 2002 as a standalone disc, and then on Network's 2007 40th anniversary DVD and BluRay sets in the UK and in 2009 in the A&E Home Video DVD and Blu-ray box sets. This alternative version was located on a near-pristine 35mm print and has been transferred in high-definition along with the 17 episodes for the Blu-ray release. An early edit of "The Chimes of Big Ben", again with an unbroadcast music score and additional scenes and dialogue not in the broadcast version, was located in the 1980s and initially released on VHS videotape by MPI Home Video. It was later included as a bonus feature on both the 2007 Network set and the A&E Home Video DVD release of the series in the early 2000s. In 2009 it was also included in the expanded A&E Home Video box set, but owing to the low quality of the print it was not upgraded to high definition as was "Arrival", and was instead included as a bonus on the set's standard DVD extras disc, which was included in both the DVD and Blu-ray editions.

Episode viewing order
General agreement exists on the first episode and the last two episodes of the 17 produced shows, but extensive debate has taken place among dedicated fans regarding a "correct" order for the intermediate 14 episodes. The order in which the episodes were originally broadcast in Britain differs from the order in which they were produced. Even the broadcast order is not that originally intended by series star and co-creator Patrick McGoohan. Many have analysed the series line-by-line for time references, which in many cases provide different—sometimes radically different—episode orders compared to the broadcast order.

Ian Rakoff (assistant editor on two episodes and co-writer of "Living in Harmony") authored a book in 1998 on his experience working on the series, wherein the appendices include a numbered episode guide which reflects the original UK broadcast order, as do the nine-volume Laserdisc releases of the series, also released in 1998. However, the 2006 40th Anniversary Collector's Edition (DVD boxed set) released in association with American television's Arts & Entertainment Channel (A&E) uses a different order. The set goes so far as to include a guidebook with justifications for their version, citing—among other reasons—the aforementioned "time references", such as Number Six telling other members of the Village that he is "new here".

The first UK transmission of each of the first 14 episodes was made by ATV (Midlands) and Grampian Television. The final three episodes were first shown in the UK by Scottish Television.

Unproduced episodes
Story lines and scripts that the series did not use are known to exist, several of which were published in a two-volume collection – The Prisoner: The Original Scripts – Volume 1 & 2 edited by Robert Fairclough and published by Reynolds and Hearn in 2005 and 2006. The scripts and story outlines were also included in PDF form as a DVD-ROM bonus feature on the 2007 and 2009 DVD box set issues of The Prisoner by Network Distrubuting.

 "The Outsider" by Moris Farhi (complete script included in Volume 1)
 "Ticket to Eternity" by Eric Mival (synopsis included in Volume 1)
 "Friend or Foe" by Eric Mival (synopsis included in Volume 1)
 "Don't Get Yourself Killed" by Gerald Kelsey (complete script included in Volume 2)

Documentary
A documentary entitled Don't Knock Yourself Out was produced in 2007, containing behind-the-scenes footage, and archival and newly recorded interviews with the cast and production staff. It is narrated by Neil Pearson and runs approximately 90 minutes.

References